Yallah is a western suburb in the City of Wollongong, New South Wales, Australia, located on the western shore of Lake Illawarra. It contains a mixture of rural, commercial and light industrial areas.

Etymology
Yallah is an Australian Aboriginal word for which a number of meanings are given; native apple tree; a nearby lagoon; and "go away at once".

Developments

The Tallawarra Power Station on the shores of Lake Illawarra and adjacent to Yallah was commissioned in 1952 and commenced operations in 1954 as a thermal power station. The station closed in 1989 and was reconditioned as a  combined cycle natural gas power station.

The Yallah railway station opened in 1887, and closed in 1974.

See also

Illawarra

References

Suburbs of Wollongong
City of Wollongong